is a Japanese manga series written and illustrated by Konomi Shikishiro. It has been serialized in Shogakukan's seinen manga magazine Big Comic Superior since May 2017.

Publication
Shogakukan has collected its chapters into individual tankōbon volumes. The first volume was released on June 29, 2018. As of March 30, 2021, four volumes have been released.

Volume list

References

Further reading

External links
 

Seinen manga
Sex comedy anime and manga
Shogakukan manga